Steffi Kriegerstein (born 3 November 1992) is a German canoeist. She competed in the women's K-4 500 metres event at the 2016 Summer Olympics where the team won a silver medal.

In 2015 she was world champion in the K2 1000 meters in Milan, and won silver and bronze in the K4 2017 and 2018 World Cup.

She missed the 2020 Summer Olympics because of a COVID-19 infection, and retired in 2022, age 29, due to the effects of Long COVID.

References

External links
 

1992 births
Living people
German female canoeists
Olympic canoeists of Germany
Canoeists at the 2016 Summer Olympics
Medalists at the 2016 Summer Olympics
Olympic silver medalists for Germany
Olympic medalists in canoeing
Place of birth missing (living people)
ICF Canoe Sprint World Championships medalists in kayak
Sportspeople from Dresden
European Games competitors for Germany
Canoeists at the 2019 European Games